Italy participated in the Junior Eurovision Song Contest 2019 which took place on 24 November 2019 in Gliwice, Poland. The Italian broadcaster Rai Gulp, which is a channel owned by Radiotelevisione Italiana (RAI), was responsible for organising their entry for the contest. Marta Viola was internally selected to represent Italy with the song "La voce della terra".

Background

Before Junior Eurovision
The Italian broadcaster announced on 26 June 2018, that they would be participating at the contest which takes place on 24 November 2019, in Gliwice, Poland. The method for selecting their entrant and song was done internally by the national broadcaster, RAI. On 9 October 2019, it was announced that Marta Viola would be representing Italy at the contest with the song "La voce della terra".

At Junior Eurovision
During the opening ceremony and the running order draw which both took place on 18 November 2019, Italy was drawn to perform seventeenth on 24 November 2019, following Portugal and preceding Albania.

Voting

Detailed voting results
The following members comprised the Italian jury:
 Alessandro Pigliavento (jury chairperson)blogger, founder of Eurofestival News
 Cristina Insalacojournalist for La Stampa
 Laura GaliganiProfessor at the Turin Musical Academy

References

Italy
Junior
Junior Eurovision Song Contest